Isidora Simijonović is a Serbian actress.

She is best known for her performance as Saša in the TV drama series Jutro će promeniti sve, which follows the lives of a group of young adults in contemporary Belgrade.

Isidora graduated acting from Belgrade Academy of Arts.

Simijonović began her acting career with the play Pazi vamo performed in Boško Buha theatre in 2010, when she was still in high school. After she had enrolled the academy, she has played in few Belgrade theaters including National Theatre in Belgrade, Belgrade drama theatre, Atelje 212 , Bitef theater and Zvezdara theater.

Her film career started with a lead role in the movie Klip, directed by Maja Miloš, when she was 16 years old. She portrays a sullen high school student from a Belgrade suburb. For her performance, she won the award for the best actress at the Vilnius International Film Festival and 'The Golden Hazelnut' (Zlatni lešnik) award for the best actress at the fifth International Festival of Film Direction in Leskovac. After this breakthrough debut role, Simijonović went on to star in several films such as Gde je Nađa? and Atomski zdesna. She also played Katarina in Dobra žena which was screened at many film festivals, including Sundance Film Festival, FEST (Belgrade) and Crossing Europe in Linz. She made her television debut with a minor role in Andrija i Anđelka. She is also known for her role of Ruža in popular crime television show Ubice moga oca. 

She played journalist Nataša in Porodica, a five-part drama series about the arrest of Slobodan Milošević, released in 2021.

For her stage performance in Jami distrikt she received Dara Čalenic Foundation Award for the Best Young Actress on theatre festival Sterijino pozorje.

Filmography

Film

Television

Theatre credits

References

External links 
 

1995 births
Living people
Actresses from Belgrade